Jalen "Teez" Tabor (born December 31, 1995) is an American football safety for the Seattle Seahawks of the National Football League (NFL). He played college football at Florida.

Early years
Tabor attended Friendship Collegiate Academy in Washington, D.C. Tabor was rated by Rivals.com as a five-star recruit. He originally committed to the University of Arizona to play college football, but he would later switch his commitment to the University of Florida.

College career
As a true freshman at Florida in 2014, Tabor played in all 12 games and had five starts under head coach Will Muschamp. He finished the season with 31 tackles an interception and two sacks. Before the 2015 season, Tabor and the Gators would have a new head coach, Jim McElwain, after the departure of Muschamp. As a sophomore in 2015, he started nine of the 13 games and was a first-team All-SEC selection after recording 39 tackles, four interceptions, and one sack. As a junior in 2016, Tabor earned his second career first-team All-SEC selection. He would forgo his senior season and enter the 2017 NFL Draft.

Professional career
Heading into the NFL Combine, the majority of NFL draft experts and analysts projected Tabor to be a first round pick. Tabor received an invitation to the NFL Combine, but put up unimpressive numbers for multiple running drills. He attended Florida's Pro Day and opted to have another attempt at the 40-yard dash, 20-yard dash, and 10-yard dash, but ended up putting slower times in all three. Tabor attended private workouts that were held by the Arizona Cardinals, New Orleans Saints, Dallas Cowboys, and Detroit Lions. His draft stock began to plummet and NFL Draft experts and analysts projected him to fall to the second or third round. Once considered a top five cornerback in the draft by some analysts, he was ranked as the eighth best cornerback in the draft by Sports Illustrated and was ranked the 12th best cornerback in the draft by NFLDraftScout.com and ESPN.

Detroit Lions
The Detroit Lions selected Tabor in the second round (53rd overall) of the 2017 NFL Draft. He was the ninth cornerback to be selected in the 2017 NFL Draft. He was reunited with Florida teammate Jarrad Davis, who the Lions selected 21st overall. Tabor was the fourth of eight Florida Gators to be selected in 2017. 

On May 12, 2017, the Lions signed Tabor to a four-year, $4.82 million contract that included $2.33 million guaranteed and a signing bonus of $1.64 million.

He competed with Nevin Lawson and D. J. Hayden for the starting cornerback position. Tabor was named the Lions' fourth cornerback to begin his rookie season, behind veterans Darius Slay, Nevin Lawson, and D. J. Hayden. On October 1, 2017, Tabor made his professional regular season debut during the Lions' 14–7 win over the Minnesota Vikings.

On August 30, 2019, Tabor was released by the Lions.

San Francisco 49ers
On September 30, 2019, Tabor was signed to the San Francisco 49ers' practice squad. He re-signed with the 49ers on February 5, 2020. He was waived on July 6, 2020, with a non-football injury designation.

Chicago Bears
On December 23, 2020, Tabor signed with the practice squad of the Chicago Bears. On January 11, 2021, Tabor signed a reserve/futures contract with the Bears. He switched to safety after not having the requisite speed to play the cornerback position for the Lions.

On August 31, 2021, Tabor was waived by the Bears and re-signed to the practice squad the next day. He was promoted to the active roster on October 19, 2021. Tabor was placed on injured reserve on December 29, 2021.

As mostly a reserve, he played 34% of the team's snaps as a special teamer and 28% of them on defense.

Atlanta Falcons
On March 17, 2022, Tabor signed with the Atlanta Falcons. He competed as a backup safety and cornerback - especially in the nickel - while also working on special teams. He was released on August 30 and re-signed to the practice squad.

Seattle Seahawks
On September 15, 2022, the Seattle Seahawks signed Tabor off the Falcons practice squad.

Personal life 
Tabor was featured in the 2022 Netflix documentary Get Smart with Money.

References

External links

Florida Gators bio
Atlanta Falcons bio

1995 births
Living people
American football cornerbacks
Players of American football from Washington, D.C.
Florida Gators football players
Detroit Lions players
San Francisco 49ers players
Chicago Bears players
Atlanta Falcons players
Seattle Seahawks players